Mordellistena leveyi is a beetle in the genus Mordellistena of the family Mordellidae. It was described in 1989 by Batten.

References

leveyi
Beetles described in 1989